Willy Braque (born Guy Francisque Peyraud, 28 June 1933 – 26 May 2022) was a French actor, director, producer and writer. He was perhaps best known for his roles in Jean Rollin classics Les Démoniaques (The Demoniaques) and Lévres de Sang (Lips of Blood) Braque also appeared in Rollin's more erotic films, such as Jeunes Filles Impudiques (Shameless Young Schoolgirls) and Tout le Monde il en a Deux. He worked with directors including Jess Franco, José Bénazéraf, Robert Hossein, Jean-Pierre Mocky and Lasse Braun.

Filmography

Actor
1963: Heaven Sent - 'Albert, le domestique' (uncredited)
1963: Le concerto de la peur
1964: Jeff Gordon, Secret Agent - Émile - un homme de Lorenz
1964: Death of a Killer
1964: Laissez tirer les tireurs - 'Petit rôle' (uncredited)
1964: Aimez-vous les femmes - 'Un sbire de Larsen'
1964: L'abonné de la ligne U (TV series)
1964: Lucky Jo
1964:The Gorillas (uncredited)
1965: L'enfer dans la peau - 'François/Frankie'
1966: La longue marche - 'Robert'
1966: Massacre of Pleasure, Jean-Pierre Bastid - 'Le gangster borgne'
1967: Amnésie 25 (short) - 'L'homme'
1967: Salut les copines, Jean-Pierre Bastid
1969: Chute libre (short)
1970: Bartleby, Jean-Pierre Bastid (short) - 'L'infirmier'
1971: La secte du diable
1972: La guerre des espions
1973: Jeunes filles impudiques - 'Older Thief'
1974: Tout le monde il en a deux
1974: La kermesse érotique - 'Satyre'
1974: Les Démoniaques - 'Le Bosco'
1975: Lévres de Sang - 'Le teure'
1975: Le jouisseur - 'Gangster'
1975: Les chatouilleuses - 'Gómez'
1976: Les emmerdeuses - 'Kashfi'
1976: Made in Sex - 'Willy'
1976: Amours collectives - 'Willy'
1976: Projections spéciales - 'Serge - le réalisateur'
1977: Positions danoises
1977: Jeux de langues
1977: Entrecuisses
1979: Les jours et les nuits d'Eva Blue
1980: Amours d'adolescentes pubères
1989: Néo Polar (TV series) - Trésor (1 episode)

Director
1967: Amnésie 25 (short)
1969: Chute libre (short)
1971: La secte du diable

Writer
1967: Amnésie 25 (short)
1969: Chute libre (short)  
1971: La secte du diable (screenplay)

Producer
1967: Amnésie 25 (short)
1971: La secte du diable

References

External links
 
 Willy Braque on Vimeo

1933 births
2022 deaths
French male film actors
French male television actors
French film directors
French film producers
People from Roanne